The 2003–04 Harvard Crimson women's ice hockey team played in the NCAA championship game. The Crimson had 30 wins, compared to 4 losses and 1 tie for its second straight 30-win season. Nicole Corriero tied former Crimson player Jennifer Botterill’s record for most points in one NCAA game with ten. She accomplished the feat on November 7, 2003 versus the Union Dutchwomen.

Player stats
Note: GP= Games played; G= Goals; A= Assists; PTS = Points; GW = Game Winning Goals; PPL = Power Play Goals; SHG = Short Handed Goals

Awards and honors
 Ali Boe, NCAA leader, 2003-04 season (tied), Goalie winning percentage, .833 
Lindsay Charlebois, 2004 Sarah Devens Award
 Nicole Corriero, NCAA leader, 2003-04 season, Goals per game, 1.20
Angela Ruggiero, Patty Kazmaier Award
Angela Ruggiero, 2004 ECAC Tournament Most Valuable Player,

Postseason

References

External links
Official Site

Harvard Crimson women's ice hockey seasons
Harvard
NCAA women's ice hockey Frozen Four seasons
Har
Harvard Crimson women's ice hockey
Harvard Crimson women's ice hockey
Harvard Crimson women's ice hockey
Harvard Crimson women's ice hockey